Paphiopedilum glanduliferum is a species of orchid endemic to northwestern New Guinea (Irian Jaya Coast, Northwestern New Guinea and Indonesia).

References

External links 

glanduliferum
Orchids of New Guinea
Endemic flora of Western New Guinea